The 1859 Ohio gubernatorial election was held on October 11, 1859. Republican nominee William Dennison Jr. defeated Democratic nominee Rufus P. Ranney with 51.87% of the vote.

General election

Candidates
William Dennison Jr., Republican 
Rufus P. Ranney, Democratic

Results

References

1859
Ohio